The following are the Pulitzer Prizes for 1978.

Journalism awards

Public Service:
The Philadelphia Inquirer, for a series of articles showing abuses of power by the police in its home city.
Local General or Spot News Reporting:
 Richard Whitt of the Louisville Courier-Journal, for his coverage of a fire that took 164 lives at the Beverly Hills Supper Club at Southgate, Kentucky, and subsequent investigation of the lack of enforcement of state fire codes.
Local Investigative Specialized Reporting:
 Anthony R. Dolan of the Stamford Advocate (Connecticut), for a series on municipal corruption.
National Reporting:
 Gaylord D. Shaw of the Los Angeles Times, for a series on unsafe structural conditions at the nation's major dams.
International Reporting:
 Henry Kamm of The New York Times, for his stories on the refugees, boat people, from Indochina.
Commentary:
 William Safire of The New York Times, for commentary on the Bert Lance affair.
Criticism:
 Walter Kerr of The New York Times, for articles on the theater in 1977 and throughout his long career.
Editorial Writing:
 Meg Greenfield, deputy editorial page editor of The Washington Post, for selected samples of her work.
Editorial Cartooning:
 Jeffrey K. MacNelly of the Richmond News Leader.
Spot News Photography:
 John H. Blair, special assignment photographer for United Press International, for a photograph of an Indianapolis broker being held hostage at gunpoint by Anthony Kiritsis.

Feature Photography:
J. Ross Baughman of Associated Press, for three photographs from guerrilla areas in Rhodesia.

Letters, Drama and Music Awards

Fiction:
 Elbow Room by James Alan McPherson (Atlantic Monthly Press)
Drama:
 The Gin Game by Donald L. Coburn (Drama Book Specialists)
History:
 The Visible Hand: The Managerial Revolution in American Business by Alfred D. Chandler, Jr. (Belknap/Harvard University Press)
Biography or Autobiography:
 Samuel Johnson by Walter Jackson Bate (Harcourt)
Poetry:
 Collected Poems by Howard Nemerov (Univ. of Chicago)
General Non-Fiction:
 The Dragons of Eden by Carl Sagan (Random House)
Music:
 Deja Vu for Percussion Quartet and Orchestra by Michael Colgrass (Carl Fischer Music)  Commissioned by the New York Philharmonic and premiered by that orchestra October 20, 1977.

Special Citations and Awards

Journalism:
Richard Strout, for distinguished commentary from Washington over many years as staff correspondent for The Christian Science Monitor and contributor to The New Republic.
Letters:
E. B. White, a special citation to E. B. White for his letters, essays and the full body his work.

External links
Pulitzer Prizes for 1978.

Pulitzer Prizes by year
Pulitzer Prize
Pulitzer